KRFF 89.1 FM is a non-commercial radio station licensed to Fairbanks, Alaska. Broadcasting at 10,000 watts effective radiated power, the station's format consists of Native American music and Americana music. KRFF is owned by Athabascan Fiddlers Association, Inc.

References

External links
KRFF's website

Native American radio
Americana radio stations
Radio stations established in 2014
2014 establishments in Alaska
RFF (FM)
Mass media in Fairbanks, Alaska